Group 6 of the 2017 UEFA European Under-21 Championship qualifying competition consisted of six teams: Spain, Sweden, Croatia, Georgia, Estonia, and San Marino. The composition of the nine groups in the qualifying group stage was decided by the draw held on 5 February 2015.

The group was played in home-and-away round-robin format. The group winners qualified directly for the final tournament, while the runners-up advanced to the play-offs if they were one of the four best runners-up among all nine groups (not counting results against the sixth-placed team).

Standings

Matches
Times are CEST (UTC+2) for dates between 29 March and 24 October 2015 and between 27 March and 29 October 2016, for other dates times are CET (UTC+1).

Goalscorers
7 goals

 Stipe Perica
 Gerard Deulofeu
 Munir

6 goals

 Nika Kacharava

4 goals

 Mario Pašalić
 Marco Asensio

3 goals

 Antonio Milić
 Gustav Engvall
 Kristoffer Olsson

2 goals

 Mirko Marić
 Josip Radošević
 Otar Kiteishvili
 Giorgi Papunashvili
 Dani Ceballos
 Santi Mina
 Denis Suárez
 Iñaki Williams
 Ferhad Ayaz
 Melker Hallberg
 Kerim Mrabti
 Muamer Tanković

1 goal

 Filip Benković
 Duje Ćaleta-Car
 Domagoj Pavičić
 Dino Perić
 Marko Pjaca
 Mattias Käit
 Robert Kirss
 Bachana Arabuli
 Otar Kakabadze
 Giorgi Kharaishvili
 Saba Lobzhanidze
 Levan Shengelia
 Mate Tsintsadze
 José Luis Gayà
 Diego González
 Borja Mayoral
 Jorge Meré
 Óliver Torres
 Davide Cesarini
 Joel Asoro
 Paweł Cibicki
 Filip Dagerstål
 Alexander Fransson
 Samuel Gustafson
 Emil Krafth
 Jordan Larsson
 Carlos Strandberg
 Linus Wahlqvist

1 own goal

 Dominik Livaković (against Georgia)
 Manuel Battistini (against Croatia)
 Davide Cesarini (against Estonia)
 Mikel Merino (against Sweden)

References

External links
Standings and fixtures at UEFA.com

Group 6
Sports competitions in Trelleborg
2015 in Swedish football
2016 in Swedish football
International association football competitions hosted by Sweden